VMMA may refer to:

 Medialaan, or VMMa
 Veterans for Medical Cannabis Access, formerly known as Veterans for Medical Marijuana Access